Kim McCarty (born February 10, 1956, in Los Angeles, California) is an artist and  watercolor painter living and working in Los Angeles, California. Her work has been exhibited in over twenty solo exhibitions in New York and Los Angeles. She often works in large formats using layers of monochromatic colors.

Career and work
McCarty works in a wet-on-wet watercolor technique, normally associated with oil painting, in which the paint is applied to a moistened sheet of paper. She began working in the watercolor medium in 1993, after her studio was destroyed by a fire and was unable to find a space with proper ventilation for oil paint. A 2015 review by Hunter Drohojowska-Philp notes that McCarty is known best for paintings of young, unclothed men and women; it describes her work in that show—images of rabbits and dogs—as unpredictable and spontaneous.

Education 
 
1988 University of California, Los Angeles, M.F.A. (Master of Fine Arts). 1980 Art Center College of Design, Pasadena, CA, B.F.A. (Bachelor of Fine Arts).

Professional life

Solo exhibitions 
2015
Maloney Fine Art, Culver City, CA
 Morgan Lehman Gallery, New York, NY  
2013
 Kim McCarty Paints, Santa Monica Museum, Santa Monica, CA  
2012 
 David Klein Gallery, Detroit MI 
 Morgan Lehman Gallery, New York, NY  
2009
 Lightbox Gallery, Los Angeles, California 	
 David Klein Gallery, Detroit, MI
2006
 Kim McCarty, cherry and martin, Los Angeles, California  
2005
 Kim McCarty, Briggs Robinson Gallery, New York, NY
2003
 Under Glass, cherrydelosreyes, Los Angeles, California 	
 Watercolors, Santa Barbara Contemporary Art Forum, Santa Barbara, CA 	
 Kim McCarty, Alysia Duckler Gallery, Portland, Oregon  
2002
 Kim McCarty, Rebecca Ibel, Columbus, Ohio 	
 Kim McCarty, Peter Blake Gallery, Laguna, CA  
2000	
 Kim McCarty, Recent Paintings, De Chiara/ Stewart, New York, NY  
1999	
 Kim McCarty, Peter Blake Gallery, Laguna, CA 	
 Kim McCarty, Ochi Gallery, Ketchum, Idaho
1998	
 Drawings, Works on Paper Inc. Los Angeles, California 
1997	
 Helen, Deanna Izen Miller Gallery, Venice, CA  
1996	
 Recent Paintings, Sharon Truax Fine Art, Venice, CA  
1992	
 Recent Paintings, Janie Beggs Gallery, Los Angeles, California

Group exhibitions
2014	
 Watercolor, Griffin Fine Art, London, England 	
 New York Armory, David Klein Gallery, New York
2012	
 Wet, Kim McCarty/Natalie Franks, Eden Rock Gallery, St Barthes, 	
 New York Armory Modern, David Klein Gallery, New York  	
 Fresh, MOCA, Los Angeles, California  	
 Selling Sex Show, studio, London, England 	
 Twisted Sister, Dodge Gallery, New York, NY    
2011	
 California Contemporary, Scott White Gallery, San Diego CA 	
 Inaugural Exhibition, Heiner Contemporary Gallery, Washington DC 
 Eve, Subliminal Projects, Los Angeles, California 
 Art Platform, David Klein Gallery, Los Angeles, California
2010	
 Dis-a-pear, Island Weiss Gallery, New York, NY 	
 Fresh Figures and Abstraction, Scott White Gallery, San Diego, CA 	
 View to the Soul, Portraiture Old and New, Heather James Gallery, Palm Desert, 	
 Medium is the Message, Peninsula School of Art, Fish Creek, WI 
2009	
 Blue, Blue, Kim Light/Lightbox Gallery, Culver City, CA 	
 Draw the Line, Lora Schlesinger Gallery, Santa Monica, CA 	
 Dillitantes, Divas and Dandies, Gavlak Projects, Palm Beach, FL 	
 Watercolorland, Samuel Freeman Gallery, Los Angeles, California  
2008
 Ces Enfants Etranges, Shore institute of the Arts, New Jersey 
 Black Dragon Society exhibition, Black Dragon, Los Angeles California
 Contemporary Art, Galerie Sho Contemporary Art, Tokyo 
 Artists Portraits of Artists, Pace University Gallery, New York, New York
2007
 Empty Nest, The Changing Face of Childhood in Art, 1880 to the present, 
 Nathan A Bernstein Gallery, New York, November 1 to January 12, 2008
 Hammer Contemporary Collection: Part 2, Hammer Museum, Los Angeles, California 	
 The Unexpected Watercolor, Lee Center for the Arts, Seattle University, Seattle, WA
2006
 100 artists, 100 watercolors, Jeannie Freilich Fine Art, New York
 August Light, Great Barrington, MA 
 Figuratively Speaking, Part 2, Elika Wimmer Gallery, New York, NY 
 LA: Now, Dominique Fiat Galerie, Paris, France 
 Portrait Show, Pharmaka Gallery, Los Angeles, California
2005
 Contemporary Erotic Drawings, DiverseWorks, Houston, Texas 
 Aldrich Museum, Ridgefield, CT
 Liquid Los Angeles: Currents of Contemporary Watercolor Painting Pasadena Museum of California Art, Pasadena, CA 
 The Unexpected Watercolor, The Art Gym, Marylhurst University, Portland, OR 
 Painted Ladies, William D. Cannon Art Gallery, Carlsbad, CA
2004
 Drawn to the Present, Pace University Gallery, Pleasantville, NY 	
 What's Doin?, Stephen Wirtz Gallery, San Francisco, CA  	
 Summer Group Show, Cherrydelosreyes, Los Angeles, California 	
 New Talent and Familiar Faces, Jan Baum Gallery, Los Angeles, California 	
 LA Woman, Gallery C, Hermosa Beach, CA 	
 Expect: Art, Sean Kelly Gallery, New York, NY 	
 Behind Door Nine, UCSB University Art Museum, Santa Barbara. CA 
2003	
 International Paper, UCLA Hammer Museum of Art, Los Angeles, California,  	
 Smoking Pencils Rolling Papers, Black Dragon Society, Los Angeles, California 	
 The Great Drawing Show 1550–2003, Michael Kohn Gallery, Los Angeles, California 	
 Wet Paint, Brea Art Gallery, Brea, California 	Biosystems, USC Institute of Genetic Medicine Art Gallery, Los Angeles, California 	
 Multiple Expressions, Jan Baum Gallery, Los Angeles, California
2002	
 What a Painting Can Do, Hayworth Gallery, Los Angeles, California 	
 Toyland, Alysia Duckler Gallery, Portland, Oregon 
 A Thousand Clowns, Robert Berman Gallery, Santa Monica, CA  
2001	
 Re-Configuration, Central Academy of Fine Arts Gallery, Beijing, China 
 Re-Configuration, Modern Chinese Art Foundation, Ghent, Belgium  
2000
 H2O, Works On Paper, Inc. Los Angeles, California 	
 For Example, Acuna Hansen, Los Angeles, California 	
 Paintings, Rebecca Ibel Gallery, Columbus, Ohio 	
 Exhibition, New Jersey Center For The Arts, Summit, NJ 	
 Certain Things: Unlikely Treasures, Elsa Mott Ives Gallery, New York, NY 	
 MOCA Auction, MOCA, Los Angeles, California
1999	
 Works on Paper, Rebecca Ibel Gallery, Columbus, Ohio 	
 Traces New Drawing, Katrina Traywick Gallery, Berkeley, CA
1997	
 LA Current: A Media Fusion, UCLA  Gallery at the Armand Hammer Museum of Art, Los Angeles, California 	
 The Painted Image, Deanna Izen Miller Gallery, Venice, CA 	
 Group Exhibition, Sharon Truax Fine Art, Venice, CA 	
 LA Current: The Female Perspective, UCLA Gallery / Armand Hammer Museum, L.A. 
1995	
 LA Woman, Lutz Hegenbarth, Cologne, Germany

Selected public and private collections
 
 Museum of Modern Art, New York, NY * UCLA Hammer Museum of Art, Los Angeles, California
 The Microsoft Collection, Seattle, WI * Judith Rothschild Foundation, New York, NY 
 Latham and Watkins, New York, NY * Neuburger and Berman, Los Angeles, California
 Honolulu Academy of Art, Honolulu, Hawaii

Bibliography 
 Vogue, Irene Neuwirth, index, March 2013
 Huffington Post, Boys and Girls Brings Uncertain Humanity to Morgan Lehman Gallery, November 14, 2012
 Elist Jasmine, Subliminal Projects Gallery "Eve" is all about Female Creation. LA Times. July 28, 2011 
 S.R. Leher, Kim McCarty At Kim Light/Lightbox, Los Angeles, Art on Paper, September/October 2009 
 Miles, Christopher, Kim McCarty, LA Weekly, April 30, 2009
 Drohojowska-Philp, Hunter, Artist's Pick, Artnews, February, 2006
 Pincus, Robert, "Ladies and Dreamscapes", The San Diego Union Tribune, June 30, 2005
 Genocchio, Benjamin, "Erotic Goes Mainstream" The New York Times, Sunday, May 8, 2005
 Karlins, N.F. "Teenage Tempest", Artnet, Thursday, April 7, 2005
 Lombardi, D. Dominick, "Drawn to the Present", The New York Times, Sunday, October 17, 2004
 Jones, Lesli, "Step into Liquid", Art on Paper, July/August, 2004
 Frank, Peter, "Mark Steven Greenfield, LA Woman," Pick of the week, LA Weekly, May 4–10, 2004
 Wood, Eve, Mojo Rising," Artnet, May 2, 2004
 Pence, Elizabeth, "LA Woman," Artweek, May, 2004
 Green, Tyler, "DC Dairy, Revival of Painting," Artnet, March 17, 2004
 New American Painting, 49th Edition, 2003, (cover)
 El-Diri, Hanadi, "Youth," An-Nahar, Beirut, Lebanon, July 3, 2003
 Mageean, Sean, "The Dreams of Children, New Watercolors, by Kim McCarty," The Independent, June 12, 2003
 Donelon, Charles, "Brutal Youth," Santa Barbara News Press, May 2003
 Frank, Peter, "International Paper," Art on Paper, April 2003
 Chen, Eva, "Artists," Elle Magazine, April 2003
 Dambrot, Shana Nys, "Kim McCarty at cherrydelosreyes," Artweek, March 2003
 Knight, Christopher, "Drawing Not Toeing the Line," Los Angeles Times, February 7, 2003
 Ohlman, Leah, "Teens Stripped of Their Veneer," Los Angeles Times, February 7, 2003
 Fyer-Kohles, Jeanne, "Two Rooms best for vastly different works," Columbus Dispatch, November 2002
 Green, Robert, "Artist Curates," Artforum, April 2002
 Wei, Lilly, "Elsewhere, Everywhere, Here," catalog essay, "Re-configuration," 2001
 Galleries New York, Contemporary Art Report, October 2000
 Kokot, Sharon, "Works on Paper" hardly flimsy," The Columbus Dispatch, June 1999
 Kaplan, Peggy Hall, "Malibu Artist Draws Her Motivation from Experiencing Trial by Fire," Malibu Surfside News, February 11, 1999
 Clothier, Peter, "Inside-Out," catalog essay for Kim McCarty, Works on Paper, Inc. August 28. 1998
 Irmas, Deborah, "L.A. Summer Surf," Artnet, July/August 1998

References

External links and additional references
 Kim McCarty Art on 1stdibs.com
 Kim McCarty official website
 Newsletter, East Asian Art and Archaeology, Issues 57-70
 San Diego Magazine, July 2005 - Page 239
 Hometown Santa Monica: The Bay Cities Book

1956 births
Living people
American women painters
University of California, Los Angeles alumni
21st-century American women artists